Ben Silverman (born November 15, 1987) is a Canadian professional golfer who has played on the PGA Tour. In 2017 he won the Price Cutter Charity Championship.

Early and personal life
Silverman was born in Thornhill, Ontario, in Canada, to Howard and Maureen Silverman, and is Jewish. He played golf at Vaughan Secondary School in Vaughan, Ontario.

Silverman attended Johnson & Wales University in Florida for two years, and then Florida Atlantic University, where Silverman obtained a bachelor's degree in psychology in 2010. He was a walk-on on the golf teams of both schools.

Silverman lives in West Palm Beach, Florida. He and his wife, Morgan, have one son.

Professional career
Silverman turned pro in 2010. He joined the PGA Tour Canada in 2014. In 2015, he qualified for the Web.com Tour for 2016 via the qualifying tournament, and in 2017 won the Price Cutter Charity Championship on his way to 10th place on the end of season money list to graduate to the elite PGA Tour for 2018.

In his rookie season on the PGA Tour, Silverman failed to win enough money to retain his card directly, finishing 136th on the FedEx Cup standings. He immediately regained his place through the 2018 Web.com Tour Finals after tying for third at the Web.com Tour Championship, but in 2019 was only able to finish 181st in the FedEx Cup standings and returned to the second-tier Korn Ferry Tour for the 2020 season.

Silverman won the gold medal by 11 shots in the open Men's Golf Championship at the 2013 Maccabiah Games at the Caesarea Golf Club in Israel, while the entire Team Canada won the bronze medal in the team event.

Professional wins (2)

Korn Ferry Tour wins (2)

Korn Ferry Tour playoff record (1–0)

Results in major championships

Team appearances
Professional
Aruba Cup (representing PGA Tour Canada): 2017 (non-playing captain)

See also
2017 Web.com Tour Finals graduates
2018 Web.com Tour Finals graduates
List of Jewish golfers

References

External links
 
 

Canadian male golfers
PGA Tour golfers
Korn Ferry Tour graduates
Golfing people from Ontario
Golfers from Florida
Jewish golfers
Jewish American sportspeople
Maccabiah Games medalists in golf
Maccabiah Games bronze medalists for Canada
Maccabiah Games gold medalists for Canada
Competitors at the 2013 Maccabiah Games
Johnson & Wales University alumni
Florida Atlantic Owls men's golfers
People from Thornhill, Ontario
Sportspeople from West Palm Beach, Florida
1987 births
Living people
21st-century American Jews